, simply known as , is a Japanese comedian who is represented by the talent agency, Yoshimoto Kogyo.

Filmography

Variety

Drama

Films

References

External links
  
 Official profile 

Japanese comedians
1961 births
Living people
People from Kyoto Prefecture